The Louisville Cardinals Men's Ice Hockey team is an American Collegiate Hockey Association (ACHA) Division 2 college ice hockey program that represents the University of Louisville. The Cardinals are a member of the Tri-State Collegiate Hockey League. They play at Iceland Sports Complex, located in Louisville, Kentucky.

Current roster 
.

Head Coach Brian Graham 
Brian Graham is head coach of the University of Louisville Ice Hockey Program. Coach Graham is entering his 8th season here with Louisville, winning the Tri-State Collegiate Hockey League championship 3 out the last 4 years while becoming a perennial top team in the Southeast. Coach Graham and Staff are looking to continue their ways with a very strong incoming class of players for 2018–19 season.

Coach Graham is originally from Connecticut, and began playing hockey at the age of five with the Wallingford Hawks Youth Hockey Organization. He then played throughout his high school years for the Sheehan Titans in Wallingford, CT, where he was a four-year letterman. He led his team as captain for two years, after earning great respect from both his peers and his coaches. Coach Graham then continued his ice hockey career at the University of Kentucky while majoring in, and receiving his degree in Kinesiology with a minor in Business. Following his graduation from the University of Kentucky, Coach Graham went on to become the head coach at his alma mater, U of K, for two years. He coached them through two winning seasons, before moving back to Connecticut. While in CT, Coach Graham coached both at the high school level and the midget AAA level.

Coach Graham currently lives in Louisville with his wife, Barbara, and two children Colin, 12 and Ashley, 10. He is excited to continue coaching with the University of Louisville and making a deep run in the National Tournament for 2018-19 Season.

See also 
 Louisville Cardinals
 Tri-State Collegiate Hockey League

References

External links 
 

Louisville Cardinals men's ice hockey
Ice hockey teams in Kentucky